Bedfordshire County Council was elected every four years. Luton was administered by the county council until 1997, when it became a unitary authority. Bedfordshire County Council was abolished in 2009, when unitary councils were introduced across the rest of Bedfordshire. Services which prior to 2009 were provided by Bedfordshire County Council are now provided by either Bedford Borough Council or Central Bedfordshire Council.

Political control
The county council was first established in 1889. The Local Government Act 1972 significantly reformed the council's powers and responsibilities. After those reforms, political control of the council was held by the following parties:

Leadership
The leaders of the council from 2002 until the council's abolition in 2009 were:

Council elections
1973 Bedfordshire County Council election
1977 Bedfordshire County Council election
1981 Bedfordshire County Council election
1985 Bedfordshire County Council election
1989 Bedfordshire County Council election
1993 Bedfordshire County Council election
1997 Bedfordshire County Council election
2001 Bedfordshire County Council election
2005 Bedfordshire County Council election

By-election results

References

External links
Bedfordshire Council

Council elections in Bedfordshire
County council elections in England
Elections
2009 disestablishments in England